That's Life is an American television sitcom that premiered March 10, 1998, on ABC. The series is about a blue-collar family living in Queens. It was cancelled by ABC after only a little more than a month, airing its final episode on April 7, 1998, leaving one episode unaired.

Summary
Mike is head of the meat department at the supermarket. He has been married to Patty for ten years, and the two live in their own duplex in Queens. Patty's sister Catherine and her son Kieran move into the apartment above Mike and Patty. Lisa is Patty's college-aged sister, and Mitch is Mike's best friend.

Cast
 Gerry Red Wilson as Mike	
 Kellie Overbey as Patty	
 Nadia Dajani as Catherine	
 Ron Livingston as Mitch	
 Pauley Perrette as Lisa
 Michael Charles Roman as Kieran

Episodes

Reception
Rick Lyman of The New York Times called the series "an affable car wreck of a sitcom". Ray Richmond of Variety said that it is "an uncomfortably crude" series that "looks to be a jarringly insular, Hollywood vision of how the gentiles must live". Tom Shales of The Washington Post panned the show, describing it as a "pathetic attempt by ABC to do a blue-collar sitcom in the tradition of 'Roseanne'. . . . It's not imitated, of course, in ways that matter or in terms of quality and credibility." In response to the Easter episode, which aired on April 7, 1998, the series was denounced by the Catholic League for Religious and Civil Rights as "the most anti-Catholic television show ever".

References

External links

1990s American sitcoms
1998 American television series debuts
1998 American television series endings
American Broadcasting Company original programming
English-language television shows
Television series about families
Television series by 20th Century Fox Television
Queens, New York, in fiction
Television shows set in Queens